The Idolmaster is a 2011 anime series based on the popular raising sim and rhythm game franchise of the same name by Namco Bandai Games on the arcade and Xbox 360. The anime  is produced by A-1 Pictures and directed by Atsushi Nishigori, series composition by Atsushi Nishigori and Touko Machida, character design by Atsushi Nishigori, art directed by Kushiro Usui and sound directed by Hiromi Kikuta. Based on The Idolmaster 2, the anime follows a group of thirteen pop idols from 765 Productions Studios and their goal to become the most popular idols in Japan. The anime aired from July 8, 2011 to December 23, 2011 on TBS and on later dates on MBS, CBC, RKB and BS-i. An original video animation episode was released on June 16, 2012.

The anime's first opening theme song for episodes 2 to 12 is "Ready!!" by 765PRO Allstars, the thirteen idols of 765 Productions, sung by their voice actresses, Haruka Amami (Eriko Nakamura), Chihaya Kisaragi (Asami Imai), Yukiho Hagiwara (Azumi Asakura), Yayoi Takatsuki (Mayako Nigo), Ritsuko Akizuki (Naomi Wakabayashi), Azusa Miura (Chiaki Takahashi), Iori Minase (Rie Kugimiya), Makoto Kikuchi (Hiromi Hirata), Ami and Mami Futami (Asami Shimoda), Miki Hoshii (Akiko Hasegawa), Hibiki Ganaha (Manami Numakura) and Takane Shijō (Yumi Hara). For episodes 14 to 19, 21 to 23, 25 and 26, the second opening theme song is "Change!!!!" by 765PRO Allstars. For the ending theme songs, each episode has a different song sung by the idols, including songs from the games.

Episode list

The Idolmaster

The Idolmaster Shiny Festa 
The following are three original video animation episodes included with the three individual versions of the PlayStation Portable game, The Idolmaster Shiny Festa, released on October 25, 2012. They were later released internationally with the iOS version on April 22, 2013. Each episode takes place in the same time frame, revolving around a group of idols being chosen to attend a music festival at an island resort, but the idols chosen are different in each version. The ending theme song is "Music" by 765PRO Allstars.

References

External links
 The Idolmaster anime official website 
 The Idolmaster anime website at TBS 
 

The Idolmaster
Episodes